Bough is a surname. It may refer to:

People
Frank Bough (1933–2020), British television presenter
Sam Bough (1822–1878), Scottish landscape painter
Søren Bough (1873–1939), Norwegian sport shooter and Olympics competitor
Stephen R. Bough (born 1970), American judge

Fictional characters
Angus Bough, the fictional assistant to the titular secret agent in the British comedy film Johnny English

See also